Franziska Scanagatta (also called Francesca Scanagatta) (1 August 1776 – 1865) was an Italian woman who disguised herself as a man in order to attend an Austrian officer school in 1794. She served during the French Revolution and was promoted to Leutnant (lieutenant) in 1800.  In 1801 she left the army and was granted a pension by Francis I, Emperor of Austria, when he learned of her story.

Life
Born in Milan in 1776, which was then under Austrian rule, Scanagatta dreamt of joining the Imperial Austrian army. Fortunately, she was said to be "ugly and small, with a moustache that had developed through repeated shaving." Born with a rather weak body, she did exercises throughout her childhood to develop her muscles. She also read widely and went to an excellent convent school - apparently, all this exercising of her mind and body made her feel "like a man."

Military studies
Scanagatta's brother Giacomo was very different from her; he had always been quite effeminate. He was supposed to go to Vienna and train to become a soldier, but he confided in her that this was the last thing he wanted. Francesca made the most of a great opportunity: in 1794, dressed as a man, she travelled with Giacomo to Vienna and on 1 July, she joined the Theresian Military Academy in his place as a "externer Hörer" (external student - new to the army). When he realized what had happened, Francesca's father was flabbergasted and intended to go to Wiener Neustadt to bring her home, but she was so ardent in her wish to be an officer that he relented and allowed her to remain at the academy, where she gained excellent grades and graduated on 16 January 1797 as a Fähnrich (cadet/ensign).

Military service
In that rank, Scanagatta joined the 6th composite battalion, Warasdin Grenz District (combined Infanterie Regimenter No. 65 & 66), leading a reinforcement troop from Hungary to the battalion at Kehl on the Rhine just as the war ended in April 1797. In December, she marched with them to winter quarters in Troppau, Silesia and then to Klagenfurt in Styria. Always taking great care not to be discovered and trying to be amongst new people, she took the opportunity to take up a fellow cadet's posting to Infantry Regiment No.56 'Wenzel Graf Colloredo' in the autumn of 1798. She also fulfilled her wish to see various parts of the Empire, as she first visited the regiment's base in Moravia before joining the 'Aushilfsbezirk' (supplementary recruiting area) for the regiment in Galicia, where she arrived in September. She would regularly frequent the casino in Sandomir, where local society would gather, and was almost discovered when challenged by a local young man, who told her that some women thought Scanagatta was a woman. Her response was that she was glad to be judged by his wife, which was enough to persuade him to disbelieve the gossip. In February 1799, she marched with her company to the War of the Second Coalition, but en route suffered a severe attack of rheumatism. After two months' ill health and recuperation, she was transferred to the Deutsch-Banater Grenz Regiment No.12 and travelled to its base at Pancsova in the area, which is now northern Serbia.

With GR12, Scanagatta marched to Italy, where she continued to show her determination and endured exhausting marches, relying on her motto: "Una verace risoluta virtù non trova impresa impossibile a lei" (Real strength of mind finds nothing impossible.) When one of Francesca's army comrades teased her for being small, she challenged him to a duel and wounded him. In December 1799, she led the attack on the French trenches at Barbagelata. Over the winter, she spent time with her family and they tried to persuade her to leave the army. Promoted to Leutnant in March 1800, Francesca returned to the siege of Genoa in April, but her father informed the Austrian authorities of his daughter's presence in the army. She was obliged to resign on the very day Genoa fell, 4 June 1800. Her commander, Friedrich Heinrich von Gottesheim held a party in her honour, where she was still treated as an ordinary officer.

Later life
Back in Milan, Scanagatta met Lieutenant Spini of the Italian Presidential (later Royal) guard, whom she married on 16 January 1804. They had four children, two boys and two girls, and when the boys were old enough, they were allowed to wear their mother's medals, which she wasn't allowed to wear. She died aged 89. Her painting hangs in the Neustadt Academy

See also
 Johanna Sophia Kettner
 Eleonore Prochaska
 Marie Schellinck
 Nadezhda Durova

References

Sources
 "Gendered War and Military", last accessed February 10, 2006
 "Austria's Military Academy Founded By Maria Theresa", last accessed February 10, 2006
 "Women Soldiers: The Historical Record", last accessed March 10, 2006
 "Europe and Me Magazine" No.33, article by Lucy Duggan, last accessed August 11 2016 
 Militär-Zeitung 23 January 1865

1776 births
1865 deaths
Female wartime cross-dressers
Italian military personnel in Austrian armies
Women in 18th-century warfare
Women in 19th-century warfare
18th-century Italian women
19th-century Italian women
Italian people of the French Revolutionary Wars
Austrian Empire military personnel of the French Revolutionary Wars
Women in European warfare
Women in war in Italy